Ghedi Air Base is a base of the Italian Air Force in Ghedi, about 15 kilometres from Brescia, northern Italy.

It is home to the 6º Stormo of the Italian Air Force with the 102º Gruppo (Papero), il 154º Gruppo (Diavoli Rossi) e il 155º Gruppo (Le linci)  equipped with the Tornado IDS.

It houses more than 40 nuclear weapons type B61.

The commander since 2017 is the Italian Air Force Colonel Luca Maineri.

References

External links
 Information on the base

Italian airbases